John Wesley Johnson Jr. (March 3, 1916 – February 9, 1944) was an American Negro league outfielder in the 1940s.

A native of Jacksonville, Florida, Johnson played for the Cleveland Buckeyes in 1943. In ten recorded games, he posted three hits in 25 plate appearances. Johnson died in Cleveland, Ohio in 1944 at age 27.

References

External links
 and Seamheads

1916 births
1944 deaths
Cleveland Buckeyes players
20th-century African-American sportspeople